Cora Diamond (born 1937) is an American philosopher who works on Ludwig Wittgenstein, Gottlob Frege, moral philosophy, animal ethics, political philosophy, philosophy of language, and philosophy and literature. Diamond is the Kenan Professor of Philosophy Emerita at the University of Virginia.

Education and career

Diamond received her Bachelor of Arts degree from Swarthmore College in 1957 and her Bachelor of Philosophy degree from St Hugh's College, Oxford (where her tutor was Paul Grice), in 1961.

Philosophical work

One of Diamond's most famous articles, "What Nonsense Might Be", criticizes the way that the logical positivists think about nonsense on Fregean grounds (see category mistake). Another well-known article, "Eating Meat and Eating People", examines the rhetorical and philosophical nature of contemporary attitudes towards animal rights. Diamond's writings on both "early" (Tractatus Logico-Philosophicus era) and "late" (Philosophical Investigations era) Wittgenstein have made her a leading influence in the New Wittgensteinian approach advanced by Alice Crary, James F. Conant, and others.

Diamond has published a collection of essays titled The Realistic Spirit: Wittgenstein, Philosophy, and the Mind. She is the editor of Wittgenstein's Lectures on the Foundations of Mathematics: Cambridge 1939, a collection of lectures assembled from the notes of Wittgenstein's students Norman Malcolm, Rush Rhees, Yorick Smythies, and R. G. Bosanquet.

Wittgenstein and the Moral Life: Essays in Honor of Cora Diamond (edited by Alice Crary) features essays by Crary, John McDowell, Martha Nussbaum, Stanley Cavell, and James F. Conant, among others.

See also

 American philosophy

References

External links
Diamond's home page at UVa
An interview with Diamond from 2000 (pdf)
Eating Meat and Eating People (pdf)

1937 births
20th-century American philosophers
20th-century American women writers
Alumni of St Hugh's College, Oxford
American ethicists
American political philosophers
American women philosophers
Animal ethicists
Living people
Philosophers from New York (state)
Philosophers of language
Swarthmore College alumni
University of Virginia faculty
Wittgensteinian philosophers
Writers from New York City